The Castle of Alter do Chão, is a Portuguese medieval castle in civil parish of Alter do Chão, in the municipality of Alter do Chão, in the district of Portalegre.

History

Between the 12th and 13th centuries the castle was a fortified settlement. Part of the vast territory of Muslim settlement, following the 13th century it was conquered by Christian forces.

From bibliographic references, in 1211, the fortifications were part of the domains of the military Order of São Bento of Aviz.

By 1216, from the writings of João de Almeida (1945/1948), King D. Afonso II issued a foral (charter) to D. Fernando Anes, but on 30 June 1249, his successor (Afonso III) re-issued the donation to the Order of Aviz.

Between 1279 and 1325, Rui de Pina noted that King D. D. Dinis did not intervene or refer to the settlement/fortification at Alter Pedroso. During this time a small hermitage was constructed to the dedication of São Bento (St. Benedict).

Between 1350 and 1450, there was no fortification/castle.

During the events of the Portuguese Restoration War, in 1662, John of Austria raised the site.

In 1886, the cemetery located in the vicinity was constructed.

In 1940, with the construction of the municipal motorway, the southwest line of walls was destroyed and the material used in the construction. A geodesic marker was also constructed in the area, along with a lookout, followed by a reservoir by the municipal authority.

On 1 June 1992, the property came under the responsibility of the Instituto Português do Património Arquitetónico (Portuguese Institute of Architectural Patrimony), by decree 106F/92 (Diário da República, Série 1A, 126).

Architecture

The castle gate, composed of an ogive arch in the south is framed by  granite, and segment of perpendicular wall to the northwest. Immediately below and to the west are the ruins of the Hermitage of São Bento. In the southeast, south and southwest, are observation post for firefighters, municipal water reservoir and cemetery.

The small Hermitage of São Bento, with simple, longitudinal plan includes unique  nave, triumphal rounded-arch and small chancel,  and remnants of a niche, . The portico includes chamfered arch in tile masonry. What remains of the west to east is a small compartment to serve the atrium,  with structure for a bell, which accessible to the doorway and cemetery.

References

Notes

Sources
 
 
 
 

Alter Pedroso
Alter Pedroso
Castle Alter